Arthur John Betts (26 February 1880 — 4 August 1948) was an Australian cricketer. He was a right-handed batsman and wicketkeeper who played for Tasmania. He was born in Launceston, Tasmania and died in Belgrave, Victoria.

Betts made a single first-class appearance for the team, during the 1902-03 season, against Victoria. He was dismissed for nought in each innings. Betts took three catches in each innings.

See also
 List of Tasmanian representative cricketers

References

External links
Arthur Betts at Cricket Archive

1880 births
1948 deaths
Australian cricketers
Tasmania cricketers
Cricketers from Launceston, Tasmania